Arghun Agha, also Arghun Aqa or Arghun the Elder (- 1275) was a Mongol noble of the Oirat clan in the 13th century. He was a governor in the Mongol-controlled area of Persia from 1243 to 1255, before the Ilkhanate was created by Hulagu.  Arghun Agha was in control of the four districts of eastern and central Persia, as decreed by the great khan Möngke Khan.

Early life 
According to Rashid al-Din, when he was young, his father sold his son Arghun to Qadan of the Jalayir, tutor of Ögedei who passed him to his son Ilüge, while according to Juvayni his father was a mingghan commander. During his years with the Ogedeyid family, he gained reputation among the members of the ruling blood because he was well educated and versed in Old Uyghur language. Arghun started his career as bitikchi (secretary) in during the reign of Ögedei.

Career 
He was appointed to oversee vast lands from Oxus to Anatolia with Sharaf al-Din Khwarazmi as his secretary, whom he had a distaste in. His position was reaffirmed by Güyük Khan in 1246. He visited Karakorum twice after his appointment in 1248 and 1251. On his third voyage, he was upheld by Hulagu in Transoxiana and was released after a while. His employees included the famous Juvayni family, Fakr al-Din Bihishti (d. 1256), Husam al-Din Bihishti, Najm al-Din Ali, Turumtai, Naimadai, etc. He made a census in Persia in accordance with the decree of Möngke in 1254 along with Najm al-Din Ali. He participated in Hulagu's campaign against the Nizaris in Persia in 1256.

In 1259-61 he directed punitive operations against rebels in Georgia, and then was sent to Khorasan to fight the Golden Horde. He is described as faithful servant of the Qaghan in Persian sources while the Georgian and Armenian sources say he was cruel and violent overseer. However, one Georgian chronicle mentions he was a friend of equity, trustful in his language, a deep thinker, and profound in counsel. It also says Arghun conducted the empire-wide census in Russia, Arctic, Alania, Pontic steppe, Georgia, Armenia, and Anatolia. Arghun had many political enemies at the headquarters, so he had to visit the ordo of the Qaghan in Mongolia often to prove his loyalty. Although, Möngke appointed him to his former position after his accession in 1252, the Emperor summoned Arghun to answer a charge of treason. The Armenian noble, Sempad Orpelian, justified Arghun completely and charged his enemy, a Khorazmi lieutenant, with being the real offender. Arghun was released and they returned together.

Under Hulagu 
He mainted his administrative tasks under Hulagu and even punished underpaying vassals who owed them taxes, including Gvantsa Kakhaberidze, Hasan Jalal of Khachen, Zakare III Zakarian, Akhsitan II and others in 1261. He accompanied Prince Abaqa in support of Alghu against his struggle with Golden Horde.

Under Abaqa 

Arghun continued to serve Ilkhanate after death of Hulagu in 1265. His new post was in Khorasan, as deputy of Prince Tubshin. New Chagatai khan Baraq threatened to invade Ilkhanate until they leave Afghanistan to them in 1270. Arghun Aqa fought in left flank under Prince Yoshmut in Battle of Herat on 22 July 1270 which resulted in a decisive victory. He served in Khorasan till his death on 17 June 1275.

Legacy 
He appears to have funded Pir Huseyn Khanqah in Qubalıbalaoğlan, modern Azerbaijan. He is thought to be buried in Radkan, Khorasan.

Family 
He had many wives, including a daughter of Yesü Möngke, to whom he married in 1249. Another wife of his was Sürmish, who gave birth to Nawruz. He had at least 14 sons and 4 daughters:

 A son (died 1270 in Herat)
 Girai Malik
 Tatarji
 Nawruz (d. 13 August 1297)
 Lagzi Güregen (d. 2 April 1297) — married to Baba Khatun (daughter of Hulagu)
 Terjughan Khatun — married to Öljaitü
 Hajji
 Tarkhan Hajji
 A daughter — married Fakhr al-Din ibn Rukn al-Din of Kartids (1295–1308)
 Yol Qutlugh 
 Bulquq
 Oiratai
 Ertai Ghazan (d. 1297)
 Narin Hajji (d. 1297, Hamadan)
 Arghun Hajji
 Mengli Buqa
 Barghun Hajji
 Emine Khatun (died  and buried in Salmas) — possibly married to Taj al-Din 'Ali Shah, vizier.
 Begi Khatun or Ilkuye Begi — married to Muzaffar al-Din Hajjaj in 1263/4
 A daughter — married to Kingshü, son of Jumghur
 Menglitegin — married to Amir Tasu of Eljigin clan of Khongirad
 Bulughan Khatun Khorasani — married to Ghazan

Notes

References
 Amitai-Preiss, Mongols and Mamluks: the Mamluk-Īlkhānid War, 1260-1281
 Rene Grousset, The Empire of the Steppes

1275 deaths
People of the Ilkhanate
Heads of state of Iran
Mongol Empire people
Oirats
Year of birth unknown